Dieter Brenninger (born 16 February 1944) is a former German footballer.

Life 
Brenninger was born in Altenerding, and began his career with SpVgg Altenerding. In 1962 he transferred to FC Bayern Munich in the Regionalliga Süd. In 1965 Bayern was promoted into the German Bundesliga. He would go on to win the German Cup four times in 1966, 1967, 1969, and 1971. Additionally, Brenninger would claim the German Championship in 1969. His greatest honor was the European Cup Winners' Cup triumph in 1967 over Rangers by a score of 1–0.

He went on to play a total of 190 Bundesliga games for Bayern; scoring a total of 59 goals.  In 1972, Brenninger transferred to VfB Stuttgart after a brief stop-over at Young Boys Bern. For VfB he would go on to play in 81 Bundesliga games while scoring 15 goals. At the end of his career, Brenninger had a short spell with TSV 1860 Rosenheim before finishing his career at the same place he started it: SpVgg Altenerding.

Dieter "Mucki" Brenninger would achieve one cap for the Germany national football team in 1969 against Austria in a World Cup qualifying game. He was later substituted for Georg Volkert although Germany would go on to win the match 1–0.

Honours
 DFB-Pokal: 1965–66, 1966–67, 1968–69, 1970–71
 UEFA Cup Winners' Cup: 1966–67
 Bundesliga: 1968–69

References

External links
 

1944 births
Living people
German footballers
Germany international footballers
Association football forwards
FC Bayern Munich footballers
BSC Young Boys players
VfB Stuttgart players
Bundesliga players
2. Bundesliga players
TSV 1860 Rosenheim players
People from Erding
Sportspeople from Upper Bavaria
Footballers from Bavaria
20th-century German people
West German footballers
West German expatriate footballers
West German expatriate sportspeople in Switzerland
Expatriate footballers in Switzerland